Raceland was a horse racing track located in Chinnville, Kentucky, now known as Raceland, Kentucky. The race track operated from 1924 until 1928 and was founded by Jack O. Keene, who also helped develop Keeneland Race Course in Lexington, Kentucky.

Raceland made its debut on July 4, 1924, with a first-class boxing match. Over 5,000 people were in attendance. The first race, titled the "Ashland Handicap," was held on July 10, 1924, in which there were 15,000 spectators present. The inaugural Raceland Derby, according to the Daily Racing Form and Keeneland magazine, was July 28, 1924, and five horses that had been in the Kentucky Derby ran the Raceland Derby—including Black Gold, who had already won four derbies that year. 

During its heyday, Raceland was known as the "Million Dollar Oval" because of its ornate appearance. The 1.5-mile-long track was circled by a white fence of wood and iron, as well as rambling roses. The bridle paths and the front lawn were paved in red tapestry brick matching the club house, stewards' stand and judge's stand. The infield of the track contained a lake and several sunken gardens.

Financial difficulties forced the closure of the Raceland track in 1928.

Present condition
Notable structures still standing from the original complex include the clubhouse, the manager's house, servant quarters and two horse stables.
On May 26, 2004, a historical marker was unveiled near the clubhouse to commemorate the location and historical significance of Raceland. The marker, designed by local artist Tony Cumpton, reads:

A portion of the grand stand foundation can still be seen but it is over grown, there is also a small pond still remaining in front of the grand stand foundation.

References

Further reading
Raceland at Abandoned

 
Buildings and structures in Greenup County, Kentucky
Defunct horse racing venues in the United States
Horse racing venues in Kentucky
Defunct sports venues in Kentucky
1924 establishments in Kentucky
Tourist attractions in Greenup County, Kentucky